Demon Entrails is a compilation album that comprises three demos by the Swiss extreme metal band Hellhammer. The demos – Death Fiend, Triumph of Death and Satanic Rites – were all recorded during 1983 and were properly remastered for this compilation.

Track listing

Recorded December 2–4 and 7, 1983 at Sound Concept Studio
 
Recorded June 10–11, 1983 at Grave Hill Bunker

Personnel
Hellhammer
 Tom Gabriel Warrior (Satanic Slaughter) – guitar, bass, vocals, production
 Martin Eric Ain (Slayed Necros) – backing vocals, production (disc one)
 Bruce Day (Denial Fiend/Bloodhunter) – drums
 Steve Warrior (Savage Damage) – bass, vocals

Production and Artwork
 Med Demiral – engineering (disc one)
 Rol Fuchs – production (disc two)
 Philipp Schweidler – remastering
 Andreas Schwarber – photography
 Martin Kyburz – photography
 Carsten Drescher – layout, design
 Janina Kasperidus – layout, design
 Nadine Mainka – layout, design
 Patrick Schombert – layout, design
 Stefan Wibbeke – layout, design

Release history

References

External links
Demon Entrails official page
"Death Fiends": A Short Biography of HELLHAMMER

Hellhammer albums
2008 compilation albums
Heavy metal compilation albums
Compilation albums by Swiss artists